Sir Joseph Quinton Lamb (2 May 1873 – 20 November 1949) was a Conservative Party politician in the United Kingdom.   He was elected at the 1922 general election as Member of Parliament (MP) for Stone in Staffordshire, and held the seat until he stood down at the 1945 general election.

He was knighted in 1929.

References

External links
 

1873 births
1949 deaths
Knights Bachelor
Politicians awarded knighthoods
Conservative Party (UK) MPs for English constituencies
UK MPs 1922–1923
UK MPs 1923–1924
UK MPs 1924–1929
UK MPs 1929–1931
UK MPs 1931–1935
UK MPs 1935–1945